Larceny with Music is a 1943 musical comedy featuring singer Allan Jones and band leader Alvino Rey.

Plot
Believing unknown singer Ken Daniels is heir to a fortune, Hotel Deauville proprietor Gus Borelli hires him to headline with the Alvino Rey band. Hotel singer Pamela Mason is demoted to maid and waitress, after which she discovers that the Daniels inheritance was a rumor concocted for publicity by agent Mike Simms. Borelli threatens to kill Daniels when he realizes he was duped by a publicity gimmick, but doesn't as he notices his hotel showroom is packed with customers.

Cast
Leo Carrillo – Gus Borelli 
Kitty Carlisle – Pamela Mason 
Allan Jones – Ken Daniels
William Frawley – Mike Simms
Lee Patrick – Agatha Perkinson 
King Sisters
Alvino Rey

References

External links
 
 
 
 

1943 films
1943 musical comedy films
American black-and-white films
American musical comedy films
1940s English-language films
Films directed by Edward C. Lilley
1940s American films